Stephen Burrows, aka Stephen Dale Burrows or Steve Burrows, is a writer-director-actor in many movies, including Bleed Out, Chump Change and Spy Hard.

In 2009 a routine operation left Burrows' mother in a coma with permanent brain damage. His personal video diary over the course of almost ten years evolved into the 2018 HBO documentary Bleed Out as "a citizen’s investigation into the state of American health care", particularly medical malpractice, ruinous medical bills, and nearly useless insurance coverage.

Filmography

Actor
 The Soldier of Fortune (1991) as The Soldier
 America's Funniest Home Videos" (1992-1996) as Elvis, as Shriner, as Abe Lincoln etc.
 Seinfeld (1993) guest-starring as David
 My Father the Hero (1994) as Hakim
 Bobby's World (1994) as Ukulele Man
 The Second Half (1994) as UPS Man
 Bucket of Blood (1995) as Carpenter
 The George Wendt Show (1995) as Karaoke M.C.
 Alien Avengers (1996) as Detective Watts
 Spy Hard (1996) as Agent Burrows
 Chump Change (2004) as Milwaukee Steve
 The King Kaiser Show (2008) as King Kaiser
 The Big Jump (2008) as Harry Hope
 This Changes Everything (2018) as G-Man
 Bleed Out (2018)

Art department
 Little White Lies (1989)
 Face of Love (film) (1990)
 Stop at Nothing (1991)

Director
 The Soldier of Fortune (1991)
 Chump Change (2004)
 The King Kaiser Show (2007) 
 The Big Jump (2008)
 Bleed Out (2018)

Editor
 The Soldier of Fortune (1991)
 Chump Change (2004)

Writer
 The Soldier of Fortune (1991)
 Chump Change (2004)
 The King Kaiser Show (2007) 
 The Big Jump (2008)
 Bleed Out (2018)

Producer
 The Soldier of Fortune (1991)
 Chump Change (2004)
 The King Kaiser Show (2007) 
 The Big Jump (2008)
 Bleed Out (2018)

Cinematographer
 Bleed Out'' (2018)

Other
 "America's Funniest Home Videos" (1990) (video screener)

References

External links
 Steve Burrows official website
 Chump Change official website
 
 Additional works
 Official HBO Bleed Out website

American male film actors
American film directors
American male writers
Living people
Year of birth missing (living people)
20th-century American male actors
Advertising directors